If Tomorrow Comes... is the debut studio album by American rapper Maino. It was released on June 30, 2009, by his independent record label Hustle Hard, distributed by Atlantic Records. The album was supported by three singles: "Hi Hater", "All the Above" featuring T-Pain, and "Million Bucks" featuring Swizz Beatz.

Background
In 2003, Maino was released from prison after a 10-year sentence for a drug related kidnapping. He became a founder of his own independent record label, called Hustle Hard. In 2005, it was announced that he had signed a deal to Universal Records, and been started recording his major-label debut album under the title called Death Before Dishonor. However, Maino was dropped from the label and his album was shelved. In 2007, Atlantic Records signed him and took in the aegis of his Hustle Hard imprint.

Singles
The official debut single from the album, called "Hi Hater" was released on April 29, 2008. The song peaked at number 16 on the US Billboard's Hot Rap Tracks, and number 26 on the Hot R&B/Hip-Hop Songs.

The second single from the album, called "All the Above" was released on February 17, 2009. The track features guest vocals from an American recording artist T-Pain. The song became the most successful single peaking at number 39 on the US Billboard Hot 100.

The third single from the album, called "Million Bucks" was released on May 19, 2009. The track features guest vocals from Swizz Beatz.

Commercial performance
The album debuted at number 25 on the Billboard 200, with first-week sales of 18,000 copies in the United States.

Track listing

Personnel
Executive producer - Jermaine "Maino" Coleman
Associate executive producer - Jean Nelson
A&R director - Brian Berger
A&R administration - Lanre Gaba
Marketing direction - Marsha St. Hubert
Stylist - Groovy Lew
Publicity - Sydney Margetson
Art direction & design - Nick "Malvone" Bilardello
Photographer - Micheal Schreiber
Packaging production - Brian Ranney
Art management & production - Rob Gold
Management - Karl Lawrence
Bookings - Alisa Lawrence
Legal - Scott Felcher
Mastered by Chris Gehringer

Charts

References

2009 debut albums
Maino albums
Atlantic Records albums
Albums produced by Swizz Beatz
Albums produced by Just Blaze
Albums produced by J.U.S.T.I.C.E. League
Albums produced by Nard & B
Albums produced by Andrew Roettger